Philip Fleming (15 August 1889 – 13 October 1971) was a British merchant banker and rower who competed in the 1912 Summer Olympics.

Early life
Philip Fleming was born on 15 August 1889 at Newport-on-Tay, Fife, Scotland. He was a son of Robert Fleming, a merchant banker. Fleming was educated at Eton College and Magdalen College, Oxford. During World War I, he and his brother Valentine Fleming, joined the Queen's Own Oxfordshire Hussars, in which his brother was killed.

Boating
Fleming made one appearance for Oxford in the Boat Race rowing in the winning boat of 1910. He joined Leander Club and in 1912 he was strokeman of the Leander eight which won the gold medal for Great Britain rowing at the 1912 Summer Olympics. The Leander eight beat the crew from New College, Oxford, by one length in the Olympic final at Stockholm. The 2003 Oxford blue boat, which won the Boat Race by 1 foot, was named 'Philip Fleming'.

Career
He was a partner of Robert Fleming & Co, the merchant bank and he held many directorships. Fleming rode with the Bicester and the Heythrop Hunts. He was Deputy Lieutenant of Oxfordshire and High Sheriff of Oxfordshire in 1948. In 1951 he founded the PF Charitable Trust.

Personal life
Fleming married Jean Hunloke, the daughter of Philip Hunloke who had won a bronze medal sailing at the 1908 Summer Olympics.  Fleming is the grandfather of Rory Fleming and uncle of Ian Fleming, the creator of James Bond.

Death
Fleming died at Woodstock, Oxfordshire, at the age of 82.

See also
List of Oxford University Boat Race crews

References

External links
 
 
 
 

1889 births
1971 deaths
People educated at Eton College
Alumni of Magdalen College, Oxford
Scottish male rowers
Olympic rowers of Great Britain
Rowers at the 1912 Summer Olympics
Olympic gold medallists for Great Britain
Scottish bankers
British Army personnel of World War I
Queen's Own Oxfordshire Hussars officers
Olympic medalists in rowing
People from Newport-on-Tay
Scottish Olympic medallists
Scottish soldiers
Anglo-Scots
Members of Leander Club
Oxford University Boat Club rowers
Medalists at the 1912 Summer Olympics
Philip
20th-century Scottish businesspeople